The Riverside Freeway is one of the named principal Southern California freeways. It consists of the following segments:
State Route 91, from Interstate 5 in Buena Park to State Route 60 in Riverside
Interstate 215, from State Route 60 in Riverside to Interstate 10 in San Bernardino

Southern California freeways
Named freeways in California
Roads in Riverside County, California
Roads in Orange County, California
Roads in San Bernardino County, California